Pauli Emil Räsänen (6 October 1935, Suonenjoki – 18 February 2017) was a Finnish physician and politician. He was a Member of the Parliament of Finland from 1966 to 1979, representing the Finnish People's Democratic League (SKDL).

References

1935 births
2017 deaths
People from Suonenjoki
Finnish People's Democratic League politicians
Members of the Parliament of Finland (1966–70)
Members of the Parliament of Finland (1970–72)
Members of the Parliament of Finland (1972–75)
Members of the Parliament of Finland (1975–79)
20th-century Finnish physicians